It All Comes Down To This is the name of the first mixtape by Wu-Tang Clan affiliated Remedy, released on December 7, 2010, on APRC Records. Originally released as a full-length studio album, it was later released as a free mixtape download. Guests include R.A. the Rugged Man, Trife Diesel, Killah Priest and Hell Razah among other Wu-Tang Clan affiliates.

Track list
Confirmed by iTunes and Amazon.com.
 "Hip Hops Holiest" (Intro) (0:53)
 "Streets are Watchin'" (2:04)
 "Saturday Night" (featuring Trife Diesel) (1:53)
 "You Ain't a Hustler" (2:33)
 "Transporting" (featuring JoJo Pellegrino) (2:41)
 "2010 Re-Emergence" (featuring King Just) (2:01)
 "Black and White Millionares" (featuring King Just & Lounge Lo) (2:03)
 "Mob Pirates" (2:24)
 "Sinnin'" (featuring Shawn Wigs & JoJo Pellegrino) (2:29)
 "Tonites Still The Nite" (1:08)
 "Behind Those Eyes" (featuring AC) (2:20)
 "Testimony" (featuring Killah Priest) (3:23)
 "Never Again"/"Flashback" (0:41)
 "I Love My Land" (Nas Remix) (featuring Nas) (1:03)
 "All A Dream" (1:03)
 "StupidDumbRetarted" (featuring King Just & Lounge Lo) (2:22)
 "Startin' Something" (featuring King Just, Solomon Childs) (2:36) 
 "Posse Cut" (Remix) (featuring R.A. the Rugged Man, Hell Razah, JoJo Pellegrino & Blaq Poet) (2:41)
 "Ambush"/"Revisited" (1:02)
 "The Duelist" (0:52)
 "Danger" (Outro) (1:06)

References

2010 mixtape albums
Remedy (rapper) albums